Rein Helme (21 February 1954 – 31 December 2003) is an Estonian politician. He was a member of VII Riigikogu.

References

1954 births
Members of the Riigikogu, 1992–1995
2003 deaths